In Australian Aboriginal mythology, I'wai is the culture hero of the Koko Y'ao. I'wai was a crocodilian man who brought most of the Koko Y'ao religious rites and ceremonies.

References 
Australian Aboriginal mythology

Legendary reptiles